Off My Rocker at the Art School Bop is a 2006 album by Luke Haines.

Track listing
Off My Rocker At The Art School Bop 
Leeds United
The Heritage Rock Revolution
All The English Devils
The Walton Hop 
Fighting In The City Tonight
Here's To Old England
Freddie Mills Is Dead
Secret Yoga
Bad Reputation

Singles
Off My Rocker At The Art School Bop (B-side: The Best Artist/Skinny White Girls)

References

2006 albums
Luke Haines albums